James Agnew (1815–1901) was Premier of Tasmania.

James Agnew may also refer to:

James Agnew (British Army officer) (1719–1777)
Sir James Agnew, 4th Baronet
James E. Agnew (1891–1956), American politician in Boston, Massachusetts
Jim Agnew (born 1966), ice hockey player

See also
Agnew (disambiguation)